This is a list of defunct airlines of Grenada.

Defunct airlines

See also
 List of airports in Grenada

References

Airlines
Grenada
Airlines, defunct